Ramadhan Seif Kajembe (2 March 1954 – 7 August 2020) was a Kenyan politician. He was a member of the Orange Democratic Movement and was elected to represent the Changamwe Constituency in the National Assembly of Kenya from 1997 to 2013.

Kajembe died from suspected COVID-19 complications.

References

2020 deaths
1954 births
Orange Democratic Movement politicians
Members of the National Assembly (Kenya)
Deaths from the COVID-19 pandemic in Kenya